Kyrpidia is a genus of Gram-positive, rod-shaped, thermophilic, spore-forming bacteria.

Bacillus tusciae was first described in 1984, and had been isolated from a geothermal area in Tuscany, Italy. It was placed within the genus Bacillus at that time. Further work on the organism led to the creation of a new genus, Kyrpidia, in 2010. The genus was "named in honor of Nikolaos C. Kyrpides, a Greek-American genomics scientist, who co-initiated the Genomic Encyclopedia of Archaea and Bacteria." K. tusciae is the type species for the genus.

Both species of Kyrpidia have been isolated from areas of high volcanic activity in Tuscany and the Azores. The optimum temperature for growth for both members of the genus is approximately 55 °C.

See also
 List of bacterial orders
 List of bacteria genera

References

Bacillales
Bacteria genera